William Cavendish, Earl of Burlington (born 6 June 1969), professionally also known by the name Bill Burlington, is a British nobleman, aristocrat, photographer, and the son and heir of the 12th Duke of Devonshire. He was styled Earl of Burlington before his father's succession to the Dukedom of Devonshire, and has not assumed the title Marquess of Hartington as all previous heirs apparent to the dukedom have done.

Biography
Lord Burlington was educated at Eton College and the University of Cambridge. He subsequently studied photography under Jorge Lewinski.

In 2007 he married former model, fashion editor, and stylist Laura Roundell (former wife of the Hon Orlando Montagu, younger son of the 11th Earl of Sandwich) in a private ceremony. They have three children, a son and two daughters:
Lady Maud Cavendish (born in March 2009)
James Cavendish, Lord Cavendish (born 12 December 2010); second in line of succession to the Dukedom of Devonshire
Lady Elinor Cavendish (born 2013)

Lord Burlington was picked as the High Sheriff of Derbyshire for the year 2019–2020.

Chancellor of the University of Derby
Lord Burlington was installed as the fourth Chancellor of the University of Derby in a ceremony held in the Devonshire Dome (the University's Campus in Buxton) on 15 March 2018. He was nominated for this role after the previous Chancellor, Peregrine Cavendish, 12th Duke of Devonshire, Lord Burlington's father, stood down in 2018 after ten years in the role.

At the announcement of the news the previous year, Lord Burlington stated that he intended to "take the position with an open mind, not with preconceived ideas," and that he was "excited about being part of a university which offers opportunities for students from all backgrounds to reach their potential, succeed in life and contribute to society."

Art gallery
Within a wing of Lismore Castle, the Irish seat of the Dukes of Devonshire, Lord Burlington has established the notable contemporary arts gallery, Lismore Castle Arts.

Books with photographs by Bill Burlington
 Mews Style, Quiller Press Limited (1998), 
 Travels through an Unwrecked Landscape, Pavilion Books (1996),

References

External links
Bill Burlington Photography
Jorge Lewinski

1969 births
Living people
Alumni of the University of Cambridge
Photographers from Derbyshire
William Cavendish
People educated at Eton College
Courtesy earls
High Sheriffs of Derbyshire